Ratko Čolić (Serbian Cyrillic: Ратко Чолић; 17 March 1918 – 30 October 1999) was a Serbian footballer who was part of Yugoslavia national football team at the 1950 FIFA World Cup. He was also part of Yugoslavia's squad at the 1952 Summer Olympics, but he did not play in any matches.

References

External links
 Profile at Serbian federation site

1918 births
1999 deaths
Serbian footballers
Yugoslav footballers
Yugoslavia international footballers
Association football defenders
FK Jedinstvo Ub players
People from Ub, Serbia
FK Partizan players
Yugoslav First League players
1950 FIFA World Cup players
Olympic footballers of Yugoslavia
Olympic silver medalists for Yugoslavia
Footballers at the 1952 Summer Olympics
Olympic medalists in football
Medalists at the 1952 Summer Olympics